The Rural Municipality of Pleasant Valley No. 288 is a rural municipality (RM) in the Canadian province of Saskatchewan within Census Division No. 12 and  Division No. 6.

History 
The RM of Pleasant Valley No. 288 incorporated as a rural municipality on December 11, 1911.

Geography

Communities and localities 
The following unincorporated communities are within the RM.

Organized hamlets
 Fiske

Localities
 Anglia
 D'Arcy
 McGee (dissolved as a village, December 31, 1955)
 Ridpath

Demographics 

Government 
The RM of Pleasant Valley No. 288 is governed by an elected municipal council and an appointed administrator that meets on the second Thursday of every month. The reeve of the RM is Blake Jeffries while its administrator is Jill Palichuk. The RM's office is located in Rosetown.

Transportation 
 Saskatchewan Highway 7
 Canadian National Railway

See also 
List of rural municipalities in Saskatchewan

References 

P
Division No. 12, Saskatchewan